Indian River County Library System is a public library system in Indian River County, Florida that coordinates activities between its member public libraries, which collectively serve Indian River County. It is administered by a county administrator, and funded by the Indian River County Board of County Commissioners.

Mission statement 
The mission of the Indian River County Library System is to provide the means by which people of all ages, interests, and circumstances may avail themselves of the recorded wisdom, experiences, and ideas of others. In support of this mission, library materials are assembled, organized, and made accessible to all. Opportunities for personal, educational, cultural, and recreational enrichment are offered. Collections of library materials, services, and programs are planned and developed to respond to individual and community needs. A trained and skilled staff and the latest technologies are employed to facilitate and enhance the use of the resources of the library system. By committing themselves to excellence in all facets of the library system’s services and operations, the library administration, and staff, reaffirm the democratic ideals upon which the American public library is founded.

Branches 
 Indian River County Main Library - (Vero Beach) The collection consists of over 270,000 items including: books, magazines, newspapers, microfilm, CDs, and, DVDs.
 North Indian River County Library - (Sebastian)
 Brackett Library - located on the Indian River State College campus in Vero Beach. The Brackett Library is a branch of the Indian River College Library System.
 Gifford Youth Activity Center - (Gifford) The collection is primarily for children and young adults up to High School.

Borrowing Policies 
With a valid library account, patrons may borrow books, audiobooks, and magazines for 2 weeks, audiovisual (AV) materials (CDs and DVDs) for 7 days, and audiovisual (AV) equipment for 24 hours.  Cardholders may borrow a maximum of 50 books, 5 magazines, and 5 AV materials per format at a time. Overdue fines are 25 cents per day for books, 50 cents per day for AV materials, and $25 per day for AV equipment.

Library cards are free to Indian River County residents and property owners, and the applicant must provide a qualifying form of identification with the application. Library cards for children ages 16 and under must be co-signed by a parent or guardian. Library cards are valid for two years from the cardholder's birthdate, and the cardholder must renew his/her privilege in person. Non-resident cards are $10 for 3 months, $20 for 6 months, or $30 for one year.

External links 
 Indian River County Library System

References 

Library
Indian River